Ramón Marcelo Balestra (born October 8, 1967 in Casilda, Santa Fe), better known by his stage name Monchi Balestra, is an Argentine radio personality and television host.

Life and career

1967–2000: Early life
Ramón Marcelo Balestra was born on October 8, 1967, in Casilda, a city in the province of Santa Fe, Argentina. He's worked for several radio stations since he was thirteen. When he was eighteen he got his own radio station called FM TOP. At the age of 20 he went to California, United States, where he worked for many Latin radio stations. Then he came back to Santa Fe Province where he became a local celebrity.
At this stage of his career he received his first nominations for Broadcasting and Martín Fierro Awards.

2001–2011: Mainstream success
In 2001, Balestra hosted the new version of Azul TV's Versus. He also hosted Yo te avisé in 2002, Lo mejor de la semana from 2002–2003 and worked for the cable channels Fox Sports Latinoamérica and Movie City. In 2005, he was the host of the Argentine version of Family Feud called 100 argentinos dicen, broadcast by Canal 13. From 2006 to 2009, Balestra co-hosted Latin American Idol (the Latin American version of American Idol) with Erika de La Vega. On November 2, 2009 he came back as the host of the new game show Quinceañeras. The show was suddenly canceled on May 22, 2010.

2012–present: Recent years
After a two-year hiatus, he came back as the host of Real o no Real, a TV show where Internet videos were shown in order to identify which were real and which were fake. It was shown on El Trece in 2012. In 2013 he went back to Santa Fe to be the host of Rejugados, a local game show. In 2013 he started hosting a radio show called En Acción. On 1 October 2014 this radio show began being shown on Canal 5 de Rosario.

Credits

Television

Radio

See also
Latin American Idol
List of Argentines

References

External links
 
 Official Youtube Channel
 Official Facebook
 Official Twitter
 Official Google Plus

1967 births
Living people
Argentine television presenters
Argentine radio presenters
People from Casilda